Polish–French relations are relations between the nations of France and Poland, which date back several centuries.

Despite a number of cultural similarities, such as being prominent old medieval European kingdoms, belonging to Western civilization and sharing a common Roman Catholic religion, relations between France and Poland have only become relevant since the Renaissance era. From the 16th century onward, the two countries made more frequent attempts at alliances and political cooperation, and the French and Polish ruling houses intermarried several times. Relations gained greater significance during the reign of Napoleon I, when Poles were allies of Napoleon with the hope of resurrecting their recently occupied homeland, which, however, was not achieved. The French government sympathized with Polish rebels in 1830 and 1863 but did not intervene. At that time a large Polish community settled in France.

Following the rebirth of independent Poland after World War I, Poland and France were allies during the interwar period and World War II. France declared war on Nazi Germany when it invaded Poland in 1939, but for the most part France did not engage in military action, thus it was accused of failing to act accordingly. France eventually also fell to the Germans the next year, and the Poles took part in the liberation of France in 1944. The two countries were on opposite sides during the Cold War. Although the Polish Army has never fought against France, repeated accusations of French betrayal has influenced the relations between the two nations. It contributed to a cold attitude from Poland to France, despite their alliance since the fall of communism in Poland in 1989.

Currently, both countries are part of the European Union, NATO, OECD and OSCE. Poland is also an observer in the Organisation internationale de la Francophonie.

Comparison

History

Before the 18th century

Polish–French relations were nascent until the 18th century, due to geographical distance and the Polish–Lithuanian Commonwealth's lack of involvement in the wars of Western Europe. French and Polish troops fought together as part of a larger European coalition against the Ottoman invasion of Europe at the Battle of Nicopolis in 1396. In 1524, a Franco-Polish alliance was formed, however it fell through after King Francis I of France was defeated and captured by troops of Charles V of Austria and Spain in the Battle of Pavia in 1525. In 1573, Henry III of France was elected king of Poland, but he abdicated the next year to become king of France. The French Order of the Holy Spirit was dedicated to the Holy Spirit for commemorating Henry III's succession as king of Poland (1573) and France (1574) on two Pentecosts.

Two Polish kings, Władysław IV Vasa and John II Casimir, were married to French princess Ludwika Maria Gonzaga. After his abdication in 1668, John II Casimir left for France, where he joined the Jesuits and became abbot of Saint-Germain-des-Prés in Paris. His heart was buried there.
In the late 17th century, King John III Sobieski married French princess Marie Casimire Louise de la Grange d'Arquien and tried to forge a Polish–French alliance. An alliance treaty was signed in 1675, however, due to external factors it was not implemented.

Charles-Paris d'Orléans; François Louis, prince of Conti; Henri Jules, prince of Condé; and Louis, prince of Condé were candidates for the Polish throne.

18th century

In the 1730s, Stanisław I Leszczyński, king of Poland, who tried to continue Sobieski's efforts and align Poland and France, after losing the War of the Polish Succession, retired to France, where he became duke of Lorraine in 1737. He was a great patron of arts and science in Lorraine. He established the Académie de Stanislas in Nancy, and he commissioned the construction of the Place Stanislas, Nancy's stunning main city square and UNESCO World Heritage Site. In the mid-18th century, his daughter, Princess Marie Leszczyńska was the queen consort of France and wife of Louis XV.

During the anti-Russian Confederation of Bar the French Court Royal supported the Polish confederates by sending French officers under Charles François Dumouriez.
In the late 18th century both Poland and France entered a revolutionary period, with the French Revolution being a major influence on the reforms of the Great Sejm in Poland. There was, however, never any official Polish–French alliance; in fact France was content to deflect some of its troubles by not allying itself with Poland, as Poland's neighbors, Prussia, Austria, and Russia, expecting a formation of such an alliance, and seeing Polish reforms as a sign of Jacobinite influence, were busy carrying out the partitions of Poland and had less resources to spare to deal with events in France.

Napoleonic era

Napoleon's creation of the Duchy of Warsaw gave every appearance of resurrecting the Polish nation from the political grave to which it had been consigned in the partitions that ended in 1795. Russia defeated Napoleon and made the 'independence' no more meaningful than that of Congress Poland, which emerged from the Vienna settlement. However, the Duchy represented the hope of true independence, whereas Congress Poland was always in Russia's shadow.

The other lasting significance of Napoleon's Grand Duchy is that it cast off old feudal Poland to some degree under the rule of the partitioning powers. Serfdom was abolished and a modern legal code based on the French model was introduced. Critical was the contribution the Napoleonic period made towards the creation of a national legend or myth, which was to sustain and comfort Poles down the decades that followed. Amongst other things, it contributed to a belief that the rest of Europe had an abiding interest in the fate of Poland, arising from Bonaparte's support in 1797 for the formation of Polish Legions, recruited from amongst émigrés and other exiles living in Italy. The Polish national anthem, "Dąbrowski's Mazurka", is a celebration of the legion's commander, Jan Henryk Dąbrowski, and Napoleon is only mentioned in passing. Napoleon's treatment of these soldiers was cynical in the extreme. After the Treaty of Lunéville in 1801, they were sent to the West Indies to suppress the slave revolt in the French colony Saint-Domingue, or modern  Haiti.

Napoleon continued to use Poles where it suited him best. Of the fresh forces raised after the creation of the Grand Duchy of Warsaw, some 10,000 were sent to fight against the Spanish and the British in the Peninsular War. However, the Poles were most enthusiastic about the 1812 war against Russia-which Napoleon called the Second Polish War-as they formed by far the largest foreign contingent of the Grand Army. There is no precise information on what form the peace would have taken if Napoleon had won his war against Alexander, but many Poles held to the belief that it would, at the very least, have led to a fully restored Poland, including Lithuania; a return, in other words, to the situation prior to the first partition in 1772. The whole experience of the Grand Duchy of Warsaw is one of Polish confidence in Napoleon's promise of a better future, though there is really nothing that proves he would have fulfilled these expectations.

Polish national determination did impact Czar Alexander I, as he accepted that there could be no return to the position prevailing in 1795, when Poland had been extinguished. On his insistence, lands that had fallen to Prussia on the Third Partition, including the city of Warsaw, became part of his new 'Polish State', a satellite state that had a high degree of political latitude and one that preserved the Napoleonic code. Alexander may have hoped to transfer some of the fierce loyalty the Poles had formerly shown towards his great rival towards himself; but he merely perpetuated a myth. The hope of a liberal Poland, of Napoleon's Poland was kept alive, until it was all but destroyed in the uprising of 1830–1831. Thereafter, most of those who went into exile sought refuge in France, the home of the Napoleon myth, which gave it fresh life. In 1834, from his Paris exile, Adam Mickiewicz wrote his epic poem, Pan Tadeusz, which celebrates Napoleon's entry into Lithuania in 1812 thus; All sure of victory, cry with tears in eyes/God is with Napoleon, and Napoleon is with us!

Although the legend declined over the years, especially as Napoleon III offered no support to the Polish rising of 1863, it did not altogether die. It received fresh encouragement in 1918, as France was the only western power that offered unqualified support to the newly independent Poland. May 5, 1921, the hundredth anniversary of Napoleon's death, was formally marked by commemorations across the new nation. And he lives, and will continue to live, in the national anthem.

Great Emigration

The Great Emigration was an emigration of political elites from partitioned Poland from 1831 to 1870, particularly after the November and January uprisings. Since the end of the 18th century, people who carried out their activities outside the country as emigres played a major role in Polish political life.  Because of this emigration of political elites, much of the political and ideological activity of the Polish intelligentsia during the 18th and 19th centuries was done outside of the lands of partitioned Poland. Most of those political émigrés were based in France, seen by the Poles - freshly influenced by Napoleon - as the bastion of liberty in Europe.

It was during that era that some celebrated Poles came to live in France, such as the composer Frédéric Chopin, writers like Adam Mickiewicz, Cyprian Norwid or entrepreneurs like Louis Wolowski and Citroen and much later, the scientist Maria Skłodowska-Curie (Marie Curie).

Some of the remnants of the 19th-century Polish community in France, i.e. the Polish Library, Adam Mickiewicz Museum and Polish Historical and Literary Society in Paris are listed by UNESCO's Memory of the World Programme.

Interwar period
Poland and France were political and military allies during the interwar period. The political agreement signed in Paris on February 19, 1921 established cooperation between them. Starting with the Blue Army that aided France in World War I and the French Military Mission to Poland during the Polish–Soviet War (1919–1921), the Franco-Polish Military Alliance was signed in 1921 and continued until the German invasion of Poland.

World War II

France declared war on Germany when it invaded Poland in 1939, and then attacked Germany, however, the French soon withdrew in what is known as the Phoney War. During the German invasion, Poland evacuated its gold reserve to France. During the subsequent German occupation of Poland, a new Polish Army formed in France under the command of General Władysław Sikorski in late 1939. Polish units included the 1st Grenadiers Division, among others. France itself fell to Germany following the German invasion of France in 1940, and afterwards, 23,000 Poles were deported by the Germans to slave labour in German-occupied France, and French prisoners of war were also deported to German prisoner-of-war camps and forced labour camps in German-occupied Poland. Due to the German occupation of both countries, official Polish–French relations ceased in 1940–44. Some Poles became part of the French Resistance. Polish troops also took part in the liberation of France in 1944. Despite this, France was blamed for betraying its promise to help in Poland, due to the alliance treaty signed between Poland and France prior to World War II; later it was extended after large territories in the East of Poland was annexed by the Soviet Union, which eventually became modern Belarus, Ukraine and Lithuania after the Dissolution of the Soviet Union in 1990–1991.

Cold War
During the Cold War, Polish–French relations were poor, due to both countries being on the opposite sides of the Cold War. However France was - again - a site of a thriving Polish emigrant community (see Kultura and Jerzy Giedroyc). Other prominent members of the Polish community in France of that period have included Rene Goscinny.

Post-1991

Polish-French relations have improved after the fall of communism. Poland, France and Germany are part of the Weimar Triangle which was created in 1991 to strengthen cooperation between the three countries.

France, as a founding member of the European Community, European Union, and NATO, as well as a permanent member of the United Nations Security Council and nuclear power, is one of Poland's principal political, economic, cultural, scientific and technological partners.

The year 2004 marked a breakthrough in Polish-French relations. After a period of tension caused by different approaches to the Iraq crisis and the European Constitution negotiations, relations improved. After the accession of Poland to the European Union on May 1, 2004, meetings of the heads of state from both countries have been organized yearly.

France is the largest contributor of foreign direct investment in Poland. The French companies with the largest presence in Poland include Orange, Vivendi, Carrefour, Casino, Crédit Agricole, Saint Gobain and Auchan.

Controversy was caused by the phrase "Polish Plumber", which appeared in France around 2005.

About one million ethnic Poles live in France, concentrated in the Nord-Pas de Calais region, in the metropolitan area of Lille and the coal-mining region (bassin minier) around Lens and Valenciennes. Polish mineurs' descendants are also found in Auberny.

Poland and France have held intergovernmental consultations on several occasions. The last such summit took place on 2015 in Paris with President François Hollande and Prime Minister Ewa Kopacz.

In August 2022, Poland sent 146 firefighters and 49 vehicles to France, the largest such group from a foreign country to help extinguish the 2022 wildfires in France.

Resident diplomatic missions
 France has an embassy in Warsaw and a consulate-general in Kraków.
 Poland has an embassy in Paris and a consulate-general in Lyon.

See also
Poles in France
French people in Poland
List of Ambassadors of France to Poland
Polish Legions
Franco-Polish alliance
Hôtel Lambert
List of twin towns and sister cities in France
List of twin towns and sister cities in Poland
France–Ukraine relations
Germany–Poland relations
Poland in the European Union

References

Further reading
 Cienciala, Anna,  and Titus Komarnicki. From Versailles to Locarno: Keys to Polish Foreign Policy, 1919-1925 (1984)
 Cienciala, Anna. Poland and the Western Powers, 1938-1939: A Study in the Interdependence of Eastern and Western Europe,  (1968)
 Davies, Norman. God's Playground: A History of Poland, Vol. 1: The Origins to 1795 (2005)
 Davies, Norman. God's Playground: A History of Poland, Vol. 2: 1795 to the Present (2005)
 Karski, Jan. The Great Powers & Poland, 1919-1945: from Versailles to Yalta (UP of America, 1985).
 Lobanov-Rostovsky, Andrei. Russia and Europe, 1825-1878 (1954)
 Lobanov-Rostovsky, Andrei. Russia and Europe 1789-1825 (1968)
 MacDonald, Callum A. "Britain, France and the April crisis of 1939." European Studies Review 2.2 (1972): 151–169.
 Majchrowski, Tomasz and  Adam Halamski. "Polish–French Relations", Yearbook of Polish Foreign Policy (01/2005), 
 Nieuwazny, Andrzej. "Napoleon and Polish identity" History Today, Vol. 48, May 1998 ,  and 
 Pasztor, Maria. "France, Great Britain, and Polish conceptions of disarmament, 1957-1964." Acta Poloniae Historica 90 (2004): 113–155. online
 Roberts, Geoffrey. "The Alliance that Failed: Moscow and the Triple Alliance Negotiations, 1939." European History Quarterly 26.3 (1996): 383–414.
 Stanley, John. "French Attitudes toward Poland in the Napoleonic Period." Canadian Slavonic Papers 49.3-4 (2007): 209–227.
 Urbaniak, George. "French involvement in the Polish-Lithuanian dispute, 1918–1920." Journal of Baltic Studies 16.1 (1985): 52–63.
 Wandycz, Piotr S. France and Her Eastern Allies, 1919-1925: French-Czechoslovak-Polish Relations from the Paris Peace Conference to Locarno (1962).
 Wandycz, Piotr S.  "French Diplomats in Poland 1919-1926." Journal of Central European Affairs 23#$ (1964): 440–50.
 Wandycz, Piotr S. "General Weygand and the Battle of Warsaw of 1920." Journal of Central European Affairs 19#4 4 (1960): 357–65.
 Weber, Pierre-Frédéric. "France, Poland, and Germany’s Eastern Border, 1945–1990." in France and the German Question, 1945–1990 (2019).
 Zawadzki, Hubert. "Between Napoleon and Tsar Alexander: The Polish Question at Tilsit, 1807." Central Europe 7.2 (2009): 110–124.

External links
 Echanges franco-polonais - Polish–French relations described on the pages of the Polish Embassy in France
 Stosunki francusko-polskie  - post-1991 relations described on the pages of the French Embassy in Poland
 Wojsko Polskie we Francji. Świat Polonii. - on 1940 Polish Army in France
Maciej Serwanski, Henryk III Walezy w Polsce: Stosunki polsko-francuskie w latach 1566-1576, JSTOR review

 
Bilateral relations of Poland
Poland